The 1917 Maryland State Aggies football team was an American football team that represented Maryland State College (which in 1920 became part of the University of Maryland) in the South Atlantic Intercollegiate Athletic Association (SAIAA) during the 1917 college football season. In their seventh season under head coach Curley Byrd, the Aggies compiled a 4–3–1 record and were outscored by a total of 159 to 89. The team won games against Delaware (20–0), Wake Forest (29–13),  St. John's College (13–3), and Johns Hopkins (7–0), lost to Navy (0–62), North Carolina A&M (6–10), and Penn State (0–57), and played VMI to a tie (14–14).

Schedule

References

Maryland State
Maryland Terrapins football seasons
Maryland State Aggies football